Ronald Damián González Tabilo (born 17 October 1990) is a Chilean footballer that currently plays for Primera B de Chile club Cobreloa as a winger.

Honours

Club
Antofagasta
 Primera B (1): 2011 Apertura, 2011 season

External links
 
 González at Football Lineups

1990 births
Living people
Chilean footballers
Chile international footballers
C.D. Antofagasta footballers
Deportes Copiapó footballers
San Luis de Quillota footballers
Primera B de Chile players
Chilean Primera División players
Association football wingers
People from Antofagasta